Maddison Gae Elliott,  (born 3 November 1998) is an Australian swimmer. At the 2012 Summer Paralympics in London, she became the youngest Australian Paralympic medallist by winning bronze medals in the women's 400 m and 100 m freestyle S8 events. She then became the youngest Australian gold medallist when she was a member of the women's 4 × 100 m freestyle relay 34 points team. At the 2016 Rio Paralympics, she won three gold and two silver medals.

Personal
Maddison Gae Elliott was born on 3 November 1998 in Newcastle, New South Wales. She has right side cerebral palsy as a result of a neonatal stroke, and was diagnosed with the condition when she was four years old. In addition to swimming, she participated in athletics, and by 2010 held six Australian age group classification records. In 2016, she was living in Gillieston Heights, New South Wales, and a year 12 student at Bishop Tyrrell Anglican College. She has an older sister, younger sister and younger brother.

Swimming
Elliott was originally an S8 classified swimmer  but in 2017 she was reclassified as S9, a classification for athletes with less physical impairment. She is a member of Nuswim Swimming Club, started swimming when she was six months old, and commenced competitive swimming in 2009. She made her national team debut that same year at the Youth Paralympic Games, where she won five gold medals.

By 2010, Elliott held three Australian age group classification records, and the 2010 New South Wales Multi-Class Long Course Swimming Championships, she had five first-place finishes. She represented Australia at the 2011 Oceania Paralympic Championships, and later that year competed in the Canberra hosted Australian Multi-Class Age Swimming Championships. At that event, she won a bronze, five silver and three gold medals. She was selected to represent Australia at the 2012 Summer Paralympics in London in swimming.

On 31 August 2012 at the London Aquatics Centre, Elliott slashed 23 seconds off her personal best time to win a bronze medal in the S8 400 m freestyle. She went on to win silver in S8 50 m freestyle, bronze in the S8 100 m Freestyle, and gold in the Women's 4x100 m Freestyle Relay – 34 Points. She thus became, at age 13, the youngest ever Australian to win a Paralympic medal, surpassing Anne Currie, or a gold medal, a record formerly held by Elizabeth Edmondson. Afterwards, she met with Prince Harry and gave him a Lizzie the Frill Neck Lizard, the mascot of the Australian Paralympic Committee and Australia's Paralympic Teams. This resulted in the Australian Chef de Mission, Jason Hellwig, officially presenting Lizzie to the Chairman of the London Organising Committee of the Olympic and Paralympic Games (LOCOG), Lord Coe, who gave him a Mandeville in return.

In November 2012, Elliott and Rheed McCracken, the youngest members of the 2012 Paralympic Team, were together named the Paralympic Junior Athlete of the Year. She won gold medals in the Women's 50 m and 100 m Freestyle S8 events and a silver medal in the Women's 400 m Freestyle S8 at the August 2013 IPC Swimming World Championships in Montreal, Canada, and was awarded a Medal of the Order of Australia in the 2014 Australia Day Honours "for service to sport as a Gold Medallist at the London 2012 Paralympic Games."

Elliott won a gold medal at the 2014 Commonwealth Games in Glasgow in the women's 100 m S8 freestyle in a world record time of 1:05.32, breaking the record set by Jessica Long in 2012.

At the 2015 IPC Swimming World Championships, Elliott won the gold medals in the women's 50 m freestyle S8, women's 100 m freestyle S8 in a world record time of 1.04.71, women's 100 m backstroke S8 and women's 4 × 100 m freestyle relay 34 points, silver medals in the women's 400 m freestyle S8 and women's 4 × 100 m medley relay 34 points and a bronze medal in the women's 100 m butterfly S8.

Her success at the IPC World Championships led to her being awarded Swimming Australia's 2015 Paralympic Swimmer of the Year. In November 2015, she was awarded the New South Wales Institute of Sport Regional Athlete of the Year.

At the 2016 Rio Paralympics, she was a member of the team that won gold in world record time in the 4 x 100 freestyle relay 34 points, alongside Ellie Cole, Lakeisha Patterson and Ashleigh McConnell. She won her first individual Paralympic gold medal in winning the 100 metre freestyle S8 in a Paralympic record time of 1:04.73, and followed this with gold in the  50 metre freestyle S8 in a world record time of 29.73.  In addition, she won silver medals in the 100 metre backstroke S8 and 4 x 100 Medley Relay 34 points. After Elliot's success in the 2016 Rio Paralympics, she was crowned early December as the Australian Paralympic Female Athlete of the Year, adding to her impressive list of accolades.

In 2017, Elliott was reclassified to S9 and subsequently was not selected on Australian teams at the 2018 Commonwealth Games and World Para Swimming Championships. In 2019, Elliott reported that she was subjected to cyber bullying as a result of classification issues.

Recognition

2012 –  Australian Paralympic Junior Athlete of the Year
2014 – Medal of the Order of Australia
2015 – Paralympic Swimmer of the Year at the Swimming Australia awards.
2015 – NSWIS Regional Athlete of the Year
2015 – NSW Athlete of the Year with a Disability
2016 – Paralympic Swimmer of the Year at the Swimming Australia awards. 
2016 – NSWIS Female Athlete of the Year, NSWIS Regional Athlete of the Year, NSWIS  Junior Athlete of the Year
2016 – Australian Paralympic Female Athlete of the Year.

References

External links

 
 
 
 
 

1998 births
Commonwealth Games gold medallists for Australia
Female Paralympic swimmers of Australia
Living people
Medalists at the 2012 Summer Paralympics
Medalists at the 2016 Summer Paralympics
Paralympic bronze medalists for Australia
Paralympic gold medalists for Australia
Paralympic silver medalists for Australia
Recipients of the Medal of the Order of Australia
Sportswomen from New South Wales
Sportspeople from Newcastle, New South Wales
Swimmers at the 2012 Summer Paralympics
Swimmers at the 2014 Commonwealth Games
Swimmers at the 2016 Summer Paralympics
S8-classified Paralympic swimmers
Commonwealth Games medallists in swimming
Medalists at the World Para Swimming Championships
Paralympic medalists in swimming
Australian female freestyle swimmers
Medallists at the 2014 Commonwealth Games